The 2016–17 La Liga season, also known as LaLiga Santander for sponsorship reasons, was the 86th since its establishment. The season began on 19 August 2016 and concluded on 21 May 2017.

Real Madrid secured the title following their away victory at Málaga on the final matchday, finishing with 93 points and winning a record-extending 33rd championship, their first since the 2011–12 season. Barcelona finished second, three points behind Real Madrid. Real became only the second side after Barcelona in 2012–13 to score in all 38 games of a La Liga season.

Name sponsorship
The Spanish top flight dropped the sponsorship from BBVA and was now called LaLiga, while the second division was called LaLiga2. The league made this change to maximize the La Liga brand. On 20 July, Banco Santander was appointed as the new sponsor.

Teams

Promotion and relegation (pre-season)
A total of 20 teams contested the league, including 17 sides from the 2015–16 season and three promoted from the 2015–16 Segunda División. This included the two top teams from the Segunda División, and the winners of the play-offs.

Deportivo Alavés was the first team from Segunda División to achieve promotion, after a ten-year absence from La Liga, on 29 May 2016 after winning 2–0 against CD Numancia. CD Leganés was promoted as the runners-up after winning 1–0 at CD Mirandés in the last match-day, on 4 June 2016. This was Leganés' first promotion to the top division. CA Osasuna was the last to be promoted after beating Gimnàstic de Tarragona and Girona FC in the play-offs. The Reds returned to La Liga two years after their last relegation.

The three promoted clubs replaced Rayo Vallecano, Getafe, and Levante, who were relegated at the end of the previous season after five, twelve, and six years respectively.

Stadia and locations

Personnel and sponsorship

1. On the back of shirt.
2. On the sleeves.
3. On the shorts.

Managerial changes

League table

Standings

Results

Season statistics

Scoring
First goal of the season:   Juanpi for Málaga against Osasuna (19 August 2016)
Last goal of the season:   Lionel Messi for Barcelona against Eibar (21 May 2017)

Top goalscorers

Zamora Trophy
The Zamora Trophy is awarded by newspaper Marca to the goalkeeper with least goals-to-games ratio. A goalkeeper had to have played at least 28 games of 60 or more minutes to be eligible for the trophy.

Hat-tricks

(H) – Home ; (A) – Away

Discipline

 Most yellow cards (club): 121
 Alavés
 Fewest yellow cards (club): 74
 Real Madrid
 Most yellow cards (player): 17
 Fernando Amorebieta (Sporting Gijón)
 Most red cards (club): 8
 Celta Vigo
 Fewest red cards (club): 1
 Barcelona
 Most red cards (player): 2
 Uche Agbo (Granada)
 Kevin-Prince Boateng (Las Palmas)
 Zouhair Feddal (Alavés)
 Sergi Gómez (Celta Vigo)
 Cristiano Piccini (Real Betis)
 Asier Riesgo (Eibar)
 Víctor Ruiz (Villarreal)

Overall
Most wins - Real Madrid (29)
Fewest wins - Osasuna and Granada (4)
Most draws - Alavés (13)
Fewest draws - Real Madrid, Barcelona, Athletic Bilbao and Celta Vigo (6)
Most losses - Granada (26)
Fewest losses - Real Madrid (3)
Most goals scored - Barcelona (116)
Fewest goals scored - Granada (30)
Most goals conceded - Osasuna (94)
Fewest goals conceded - Atlético Madrid (27)

Average attendances

LFP Awards

Seasonal

La Liga's governing body, the Liga de Fútbol Profesional, honoured the competition's best players and coach with the La Liga Awards..

Monthly

Number of teams by autonomous community

References

External links

 
2016-17
Spain
1